United Nations Security Council Resolution 2115 was adopted on 29 August 2013. It extended the mandate of UNIFIL until 31 August 2014.

See also
 List of United Nations Security Council Resolutions 2101 to 2200 (2013–2015)

References

External links
Text of the Resolution at undocs.org

2013 United Nations Security Council resolutions
August 2013 events